China International Marine Containers (Group) Co., Ltd (CIMC) is a Chinese company principally engaged in the manufacture and sale of transportation equipment, such as containers, road transport vehicles and airport ground-handling equipment.

China International Marine Containers was a constituent of SZSE 100 Index, but was removed in January 2017. , it is one of the 200 components of SZSE 200 Index (the mid cap index of 101st to 300th companies).

Corporate History 
CIMC was incorporated in Shenzhen as a joint venture on 14 January 1980 as China International Marine Containers Co., Ltd.. After being restructured as a joint stock limited company in December 1992, and publicly offered A shares and B shares which were listed on the Shenzhen Stock Exchange in 1994, CIMC adopted its current name in 1995. Vanguard National Trailer Corp., CIMC's US subsidiary, acquired Monon in 2003.

Business Operations 
Its container department produces dry freight containers, refrigerated containers, special containers and other containers. CIMC also offers road transport vehicles, including logistics vehicles, tanker trailers and construction vehicles. In addition, the Company designs and manufactures passenger boarding bridges and cargo handling systems for airports. Based in Shenzhen, Guangdong Province, CIMC is also engaged in the real estate industry through its subsidiaries.

With over 40% market share in the international container business and 56% market share in the dry marine container market, CIMC has been the biggest container-manufacturing company in the world since 1996. It has 12 production bases lay out in South, East and North of China, with products ranging from dry van, reefer, tank and other special containers. The customers include leading shipping companies and container leasing companies.

It owns Yantai CIMC Raffles Shipyard in Yantai, China.

Listing and Shareholders 
On 8 April 1994, the A shares of CIMC were listed on the Shenzhen Stock Exchange.

On 19 December 2012, CIMC converted its B shares into H shares, and listed its H shares by way of introduction on the Main Board of the Stock Exchange of Hong Kong, being the first enterprise in China to do so.

According to the 2013 Annual Report of CIMC, China Merchants Group holds 25.54% while COSCO holds 22.75% of the total shares of the company.

Other container manufacturers 
CXIC
DFIC
SINGAMAS

References

External links 
China International Marine Containers
Vanguard National Trailer Corporation

Former companies in the SZSE 100 Index
Companies listed on the Shenzhen Stock Exchange
Companies listed on the Hong Kong Stock Exchange
H shares
COSCO Shipping
China Merchants
Logistics companies of China
Manufacturing companies established in 1960
Government-owned companies of China
Manufacturing companies based in Shenzhen
Chinese companies established in 1960